The  is a railway line in Yamaguchi Prefecture, Japan, operated by the West Japan Railway Company (JR West). The line connects Shin-Yamaguchi Station in Yamaguchi and Ube Station in Ube.

Stations
All stations are in Yamaguchi Prefecture.

Rolling stock
 105 series 2-car EMUs
 123 series single-car EMUs

History
The Ube Light Railway Co. opened the Ube – Ube-Shinkawa section in 1914, extending the line to Tokonami in 1923 and Ogori (now Shin-Yamaguchi) in 1925. The line was electrified at 1500 VDC in 1929.

In 1928 the Ube Electric Railway Co. opened a 1 km line from Ube-Shinkawa to Ubeko, with a 2 km branch to the Okinoyama coal mine, both electrified at 1500 VDC.

Both companies merged in 1941, becoming the Ube Railway Co. which was nationalised in 1943.

Passenger services to Ubeko ceased in 1952, and both branches closed in 1961.

CTC signalling was commissioned in 1983, and freight services ceased in 1999.

The entire line was switched to driver only operation on 14 March 1992.

Former connecting lines
 Ube station – The Funaki Railway Co. opened a 6 km 762mm gauge line in 1916. The line was converted to 1067mm gauge in 1922, and extended 12 km to Kibe in 1926. The last 8 km closed in 1944, and the balance of the line in 1961.

See also
 List of railway lines in Japan

References
This article incorporates material from the corresponding article in the Japanese Wikipedia

Rail transport in Yamaguchi Prefecture
Lines of West Japan Railway Company
1067 mm gauge railways in Japan